Keyport is the name of some places in the United States of America:
Keyport, New Jersey
Keyport, Washington